Juniors is a 2003 Indian Telugu-language coming of age-romantic drama film directed and co-written by debutant J Pulla Rao. It is a remake of the Tamil film Thulluvadho Ilamai (2002). The film stars Allari Naresh and Shireen, who reprises her role from the original, along with newcomers Pavan and Anil in supporting roles.

Plot

Cast 

Allari Naresh as Mahesh
Shireen as Pooja
Pavan
Anil
Tanikella Bharani
Prakash Raj as the principal
Vizag Prasad as Pooja's father
Sudhakar as a vagabond
Chittajalu Lakshmipati
Jr. Relangi
Gautam Raju
Sattenna as a teacher
Dasanna
Pardhasaaradhi
Prudhvi Raj
Banerjee
Shweta Menon

Soundtrack 
The soundtrack was composed by Chakri.

Release and reception 
Gudipoodi Srihari of The Hindu criticised the film and stated that "Naresh and all the other college boys and girls get childish cheap roles. Even Naresh the only star attraction in the cast turns out to be a dud. Shireen, a debutante is a total misfit in the cast. Experienced character artistes suffer because of illogical and unsympathetic roles. Music and photography make no sense in this kind of drama". Jeevi of Idlebrain criticised the second half of the film, but praised the performances of Naveen, Sherin, Prakash Raj, Tanikella Bharani, and Sudhakar. A critic from Full Hyderabad wrote that "Juniors is strictly for the juveniles, adolescents, teens, youngsters and any other group that does not fit into either the kids or the adults category".

References

External links 
 

2000s coming-of-age drama films
2000s teen drama films
2000s Telugu-language films
2003 films
2003 romantic drama films
Films scored by Chakri
Indian coming-of-age drama films
Indian teen drama films
Telugu remakes of Tamil films